Baurene Island is an ice-covered island extending 1.24 km in southeast–northwest direction and 350 m wide, the middle of the three islands of the Correo group in Bigo Bay on Graham Coast in Graham Land, Antarctica, off the southwest coast of Magnier Peninsula.  It emerged as a distinct geographical entity following the retreat of Magnier Peninsula's ice cap in the second half of the 20th century.

The island is named after the settlement of Baurene in Northwestern Bulgaria.

Location
British mapping in 1971.

Maps
 Antarctic Digital Database (ADD). Scale 1:250000 topographic map of Antarctica. Scientific Committee on Antarctic Research (SCAR). Since 1993, regularly upgraded and updated.
British Antarctic Territory. Scale 1:200000 topographic map. DOS 610 Series, Sheet W 65 64. Directorate of Overseas Surveys, Tolworth, UK, 1971.

References

 Bulgarian Antarctic Gazetteer. Antarctic Place-names Commission. (details in Bulgarian, basic data in English)
Baurene Island. SCAR Composite Antarctic Gazetteer.

External links
 Baurene Island. Copernix satellite image

Islands of Graham Land
Bulgaria and the Antarctic
Graham Coast